Banovci  may refer to several places:

 Banovci, Vukovar-Syrmia County, a village in Croatia
 Banovci, Brod-Posavina County, a village in Croatia
 Banovci, Slovenia, a village in Slovenia
 Stari Banovci, a village in Serbia, part of Stara Pazova municipality
 Novi Banovci, a neighbourhood of Stara Pazova, Serbia
 Vinkovački Banovci, a village in Croatia